Operazione N.A.S. is an Italian crime television series that premiered on NOVE on February 11, 2018. The series is dedicated to operations of Nucleo Antisofisticazioni e Sanità (Anti-adulteration and Health Unit) of the Italian Arm of Carabinieri. From the second season, in addition to the Command of Rome, the Command of Caserta, Florence, Latina, Naples and Pescara were added.

Episodes

References

External links

Official website

Italian crime television series